Hypodessus is a genus of beetles in the family Dytiscidae, containing the following species:

 Hypodessus cruciatus (Régimbart, 1903)
 Hypodessus crucifer Guignot, 1939
 Hypodessus curvilineatus (Zimmermann, 1921)
 Hypodessus dasythrix Guignot, 1954
 Hypodessus frustrator Spangler, 1966
 Hypodessus titschacki (Gschwendtner, 1954)

References

Dytiscidae